Old Mo's Second Spring is a 1984 Taiwanese drama film directed by You-ning Lee. The film was selected as the Taiwanese entry for the Best Foreign Language Film at the 57th Academy Awards, but was not accepted as a nominee. It won the Golden Horse Award for Best Feature Film in 1984.

Cast
 Sun Yueh as Lao Mo
 Chun-fang Chang as Yumei

See also
 List of submissions to the 57th Academy Awards for Best Foreign Language Film
 List of Taiwanese submissions for the Academy Award for Best Foreign Language Film

References

External links
 

1984 films
1984 drama films
1980s Mandarin-language films
Films with screenplays by Wu Nien-jen
Taiwanese drama films